George Richard Briggs (3 May 1903 – after 1936) was an English professional footballer who played in the Football League as a forward or outside right for Birmingham and Plymouth Argyle.

Formerly a coal-miner, Briggs joined First Division Birmingham from Midland League Denaby United in December 1923. In 1924–25, his first full season at the club, he was joint top scorer. He was used in all forward positions before settling as an outside-right, the position in which he played in the 1931 FA Cup Final defeat. In all he made 324 appearances for Birmingham and scored 107 goals, which ranks him fourth in the club's all-time top scorers table. In 1933 he moved to Plymouth Argyle, where he spent three seasons.

He was twice called up as reserve to the England team, in 1926 and 1928, but never played.

He died in his native Yorkshire.

Honours
Birmingham
 FA Cup finalist: 1930–31

References
General

Specific

1903 births
People from Wombwell
Footballers from Yorkshire
Year of death missing
English footballers
Association football forwards
Ardsley Athletic F.C. players
Wombwell F.C. players
Denaby United F.C. players
Birmingham City F.C. players
Plymouth Argyle F.C. players
A.F.C. St Austell players
Midland Football League players
English Football League players
FA Cup Final players